Kiçik Alatəmir (also, Alatemur-Bala and Kichik Alatemir) is a village in the Qakh Rayon of Azerbaijan.  The village forms part of the municipality of Qaxbaş.

References 

Populated places in Qakh District